Anianus may refer to:

Pope Anianus of Alexandria, Patriarch of Alexandria from 62 to 83
Anianus (referendary), of the Breviary of Alaric
Anianus (writer), 5th-century Egyptian monastic writer
Anianus of Celeda, early 5th-century deacon and supporter of Pelagius
Aignan of Orleans, also known as Anianus, Bishop of Orléans, canonized
A 4th century bishop of Besançon

See also
Titus Annianus, 2nd-century Roman poet